Massekhet Azilut (Hebrew: מסכת אצילות) is an anonymous kabalistic work from the early 14th century. It is the earliest literary product of the speculative Kabbala which contains the doctrine of the four graduated worlds (a doctrine not contained in the Zohar) as well as that of the concentration of the Divine Being. The Messekhet Atzilut opens with the following passage:

Dating 

The form in which the rudiments of the Kabala are presented here, as well as the emphasis laid on keeping the doctrine secret and on the compulsory piety of the learners, is evidence of the early date of the work. At the time when Masseket Aẓilut was written the Kabala had not yet become a subject of general study, but was still confined to a few of the elect.  The treatment is on the whole the same as that found in the mystical writings of the time of the Geonim, with which the work has much in common; hence, according to the Jewish Encyclopedia (1901) there is no reason for not regarding it as a product of that time. In contrast, Gershom Scholem considered it a 14th-century work.    

The doctrines of Meṭaṭron, and of angelology especially, are identical with those of the Geonim, and the idea of the Sefirot is presented so simply and unphilosophically that one is hardly justified in assuming that it was influenced directly by any philosophical system.

The book places the Archangel Metatron and the angels centered around him in the world of "Yetzirah" rather than "Beriahas," as later became the case. Beginning with Isaac of Acre and the Massekhet Atzilut, the Hebrew letter Yod (י) has been associated with the World of Atzilut, Heh (ה) with Beriah, Vau (ו) with Yetzirah, and the final Heh with Assiah, thus spelling out the name of God (YHVH) in terms of the four worlds.

References

External links 
Jewish Encyclopedia article for Kabbalah, by Kaufmann Kohler and Louis Ginzberg.   

Kabbalah texts
Kabbalistic words and phrases